Jack Elder (1885 – 24 December 1944) was an Australian rules football umpire who in 1996 was named as the VFL/AFL's "Umpire of the Century".

He officiated as field umpire in 295 VFL matches (plus 7 as a boundary umpire) between 1906 and 1922. This included 39 finals and 10 Grand Finals, both of which stand as the all-time record for any umpires active only during the time when matches were controlled by a single umpire; his record of 10 Grand Finals remains a joint record for all eras, with only Matt Stevic (who umpired during the era of three field umpires) matching it. He also held the position of Umpire's Advisor in 1923.

In a famous incident in the 1910 VFL Grand Final, a massive brawl broke out between Collingwood and Carlton players during the last quarter. A number of players were felled and four players were reported (the first in Grand Final history), yet the fight kept going. Elder settled matters by blowing his whistle and bouncing the ball. Most of the combatants looked on, stunned, as the game recommenced without them, so they had no option but to forget about the fight.

His umpiring philosophy was quoted in The Sporting Globe more than a decade after his retirement.
"Even in the hardest fought match it is important to remain calm. Use the whistle only when required. League football is not a genteel sport for schoolgirls and the term 'rough' is often misapplied. That borderline between manly vigour and roughhouse tactics is sometimes a little vague. The term 'rough football' should I think be used sparingly. 'Hard play' differs greatly from the sly bump, the kicks at ankles, the trips and the knees jolted in the backs that constitute rough and illegal play."

Elder considered the pre-World War I era of 1905–14 as the golden age of football, yet it was a period where allegations of bribery led to several League investigations, and on-field violence was at its height, forcing the League to the number and powers of umpires.  In this environment, Elder stood out, with the first VFL umpires coach (Jack Worrall) referring to him as "our leading adjudicator".

In 1996, the Australian Football League announced its inaugural inductees to the Australian Football Hall of Fame, including 10 umpires.  Above the other noteworthy inductees, they chose Elder as Umpire of the Century.

References 

 Australian Football Hall of Fame
 AFL Umpires' Association

1885 births
1944 deaths
Australian Football League umpires
Australian Football Hall of Fame inductees
People from Carlton, Victoria
Sportspeople from Melbourne